For the Summer Olympics, there are 34 venues that have been or will be used for field hockey. The competitions were first held at the Olympic Stadium until 1928 when it was held at a stadium that did not have the Olympic Stadium title. From 1936 to 1960 with the exception of 1952, the competitions were held in more than one venue. Artificial turf made its Olympic debut at the 1976 Summer Olympics. The last field hockey competitions that was not held on a single venue was in 1996.

References

Venues
 
Field hockey
Olympic field hockey
Olympic venues